Weigelstown is a census-designated place (CDP) in York County, Pennsylvania, United States. The population was 12,875 at the 2010 census.

Geography
Weigelstown is located at  (39.983847, -76.829356). It is located in Dover Township.

Demographics
At the 2000 census there were 10,117 people, 3,933 households, and 2,890 families living in the CDP. The population density was 1,740.7 people per square mile (672.3/km). There were 4,069 housing units at an average density of 700.1/sq mi (270.4/km).  The racial makeup of the CDP was 96.44% White, 1.22% African American, 0.22% Native American, 0.56% Asian, 0.01% Pacific Islander, 0.75% from other races, and 0.80% from two or more races. Hispanic or Latino of any race were 1.42%.

Of the 3,933 households 33.3% had children under the age of 18 living with them, 60.1% were married couples living together, 9.1% had a female householder with no husband present, and 26.5% were non-families. 21.6% of households were one person and 8.9% were one person aged 65 or older. The average household size was 2.52 and the average family size was 2.92.

The age distribution was 24.4% under the age of 18, 6.6% from 18 to 24, 30.3% from 25 to 44, 24.2% from 45 to 64, and 14.5% 65 or older. The median age was 38 years. For every 100 females, there were 94.6 males. For every 100 females age 18 and over, there were 91.8 males.

The median household income was $45,095 and the median family income  was $51,343. Males had a median income of $36,598 versus $23,143 for females. The per capita income for the CDP was $19,048. About 3.5% of families and 5.8% of the population were below the poverty line, including 8.1% of those under age 18 and 3.8% of those age 65 or over.

References

Census-designated places in York County, Pennsylvania
Census-designated places in Pennsylvania